The following lists events that happened during 2010 in the Republic of Guinea-Bissau.

Incumbents
President: Malam Bacai Sanhá
Prime Minister: Carlos Gomes Júnior

Events

April
April 1 - 2010 Guinea-Bissau military unrest

November
November 23 - United Nations Security Council Resolution 1949

Deaths

References

 
Guinea-Bissau
Years of the 21st century in Guinea-Bissau
2010s in Guinea-Bissau
Guinea-Bissau